The 2019 Le Samyn was the 50th edition of Le Samyn road cycling one day race. It was part of UCI Europe Tour in category 1.1.

Teams
Twenty-four teams were invited to take part in the race. These included three UCI World Tour teams, twelve UCI Professional Continental teams and nine UCI Continental teams.

General classification

External links

References

Lesamyn
Lesamyn